The Washburn House is a historic house at 40 Battles Loop in Guy, Arkansas.  It is a single story Ranch style house with a gabled roof.  It has wood-frame construction, but is finished in sandstone veneer with cream-colored brick trim, hallmarks of the construction style of a noted regional African-American mason, Silas Owens Sr.,  who built this house in 1953. It features quoined brick surrounds for the doors and windows and a front porch whose roof is an extension of the main roof, with wrought iron posts.

The house was listed on the National Register of Historic Places in 2007.

See also
National Register of Historic Places listings in Faulkner County, Arkansas

References

Houses on the National Register of Historic Places in Arkansas
Houses completed in 1953
Houses in Faulkner County, Arkansas